Hymns of the 49th Parallel is the ninth studio album by the Canadian singer and songwriter k.d. lang, released in 2004. It is an album of songs by lang's favourite Canadian songwriters, and also includes a new version of her original composition "Simple" that initially appeared on her 2000 album Invincible Summer.

Title
The album's title refers to the Canada–United States border as the 49th parallel defines much of the international boundary between the two countries.

Track listing
 "After the Gold Rush" (Neil Young) – 4:00
 "Simple" (k.d. lang, David Piltch) – 3:02
 "Helpless" (Neil Young) – 4:15
 "A Case of You" (Joni Mitchell) – 5:12
 "The Valley" (Jane Siberry) – 5:31
 "Hallelujah" (Leonard Cohen) – 5:01
 "One Day I Walk" (Bruce Cockburn) – 3:24
 "Fallen" (Ron Sexsmith) – 2:56
 "Jericho" (Joni Mitchell) – 3:45
 "Bird on a Wire" (Leonard Cohen) – 4:28
 "Love is Everything" (Jane Siberry) – 5:43

Personnel
 k.d. lang – vocals
 Teddy Borowiecki – piano, accordion, keyboard
 Clayton Cameron – drums
 Larry Corbett – cello
 Brian Dembow – viola
 Eumir Deodato – conductor
 Stephen Erdody – cello
 Cynthia Fogg – viola
 Tiffiany Yi Hu – violin
 Armen Ksadjikian – cello
 Ben Mink – acoustic guitar, fiddle, electric guitar
 Ralph Morrison – violin, concert master
 Sara Parkins – violin
 David Piltch – electric bass guitar, acoustic bass guitar
 David Stenske – violin
 Cecilia Tsan – cello

Production
 Producers: k.d. lang, Ben Mink
 Engineer: David Leonard
 Mixing: David Leonard
 Mastering: Bob Ludwig
 Digital editing: Ben Mink
 Assistant: John Morrical
 Technical assistance: David Eaman, John Musgrave, Russell Nash
 String arrangements: Eumir Deodato
 Contractor: David Sherr
 Copyist: Tom Calderaro
 Cover photo: Andy Goldsworthy
 Photography: Jeri Heiden, John Heiden

Charts

Charts

Year-end charts

Certifications

References

External links

2004 albums
K.d. lang albums
Nonesuch Records albums
Covers albums